Matías Gabriel Cammareri (born 5 August 1978) is an Argentine football coach and former field hockey midfielder.

Field hockey career
Born in Buenos Aires, Cammareri made his debut for the national squad in 1996. He played in the Netherlands for a while, at Dutch club Stichtse Cricket en Hockey Club, like his brother Lucas Cammareri. Cammareri finished in tenth place with the national team at the 2006 Men's Hockey World Cup in Mönchengladbach.

Football career
In 2018, Cammareri joined the staff of Ariel Holan (another former field hockey player) at Independiente, as a kinesiologist. On 23 February 2021, he again joined Holan's staff at Santos.

References

1978 births
Living people
Argentine people of Italian descent
Argentine male field hockey players
2006 Men's Hockey World Cup players
Argentine expatriate sportspeople in the Netherlands
Field hockey players from Buenos Aires
Expatriate field hockey players
SCHC players
Male field hockey midfielders
Santos FC non-playing staff